The Gong may refer to
nickname for Australian city of Wollongong
Leonard Howell, founder of the Rastafari movement, known as The Gong